Alpine Village (formerly, Alphine Village) is a census-designated place (CDP) in Alpine County, California, United States. The population was 114 at the 2010 census, down from 136 at the 2000 census.

Geography

Demographics

2010
The 2010 United States Census reported that Alpine Village had a population of 114. The racial makeup of Alpine Village was 91 (79.8%) White, 0 (0.0%) African American, 19 (16.7%) Native American, 1 (0.9%) Asian, 0 (0.0%) Pacific Islander, 2 (1.8%) from other races, and 1 (0.9%) from two or more races. Hispanic or Latino of any race were 6 persons (5.3%).

The Census reported that 114 people (100% of the population) lived in households, 0 (0%) lived in non-institutionalized group quarters, and 0 (0%) were institutionalized.

There were 52 households, out of which 11 (21.2%) had children under the age of 18 living in them, 25 (48.1%) were opposite-sex married couples living together, 2 (3.8%) had a female householder with no husband present, 0 (0%) had a male householder with no wife present.  There were 6 (11.5%) unmarried opposite-sex partnerships, and 0 (0%) same-sex married couples or partnerships. 18 households (34.6%) were made up of individuals, and 4 (7.7%) had someone living alone who was 65 years of age or older. The average household size was 2.19.  There were 27 families (51.9% of all households); the average family size was 2.96.

The population was spread out, with 22 people (19.3%) under the age of 18, 3 people (2.6%) aged 18 to 24, 24 people (21.1%) aged 25 to 44, 50 people (43.9%) aged 45 to 64, and 15 people (13.2%) who were 65 years of age or older.  The median age was 47.8 years. For every 100 females, there were 96.6 males.  For every 100 females age 18 and over, there were 95.7 males.

There were 69 housing units at an average density of 24.6 per square mile (9.5/km2), of which 52 were occupied, of which 41 (78.8%) were owner-occupied, and 11 (21.2%) were occupied by renters. The homeowner vacancy rate was 4.7%; the rental vacancy rate was 0%.  89 people (78.1% of the population) lived in owner-occupied housing units and 25 people (21.9%) lived in rental housing units.

2000
As of the census of 2000, there were 136 people, 54 households, and 32 families residing in the CDP. There were 66 housing units at an average density of 23.4 per square mile (9.0/km2). The racial makeup of the CDP was 61.76% White, 30.88% Native American, 5.88% from other races, and 1.47% from two or more races. 15.44% of the population were Hispanic or Latino of any race.

There were 54 households, out of which 20.4% had children under the age of 18 living with them, 40.7% were married couples living together, 9.3% had a female householder with no husband present, and 38.9% were non-families. 31.5% of all households were made up of individuals, and 9.3% had someone living alone who was 65 years of age or older. The average household size was 2.50 and the average family size was 3.24.

In the CDP the population was spread out, with 19.9% under the age of 18, 8.8% from 18 to 24, 31.6% from 25 to 44, 26.5% from 45 to 64, and 13.2% who were 65 years of age or older. The median age was 40 years. For every 100 females, there were 119.4 males. For every 100 females age 18 and over, there were 113.7 males.

The median income for a household in the CDP was $42,188, and the median income for a family was $46,875. Males had a median income of $44,375 versus $26,429 for females. The per capita income for the CDP was $24,201. There were no families and 2.2% of the population living below the poverty line, including no under eighteens and none of those over 64.

References

External links

Census-designated places in Alpine County, California
Populated places in the Sierra Nevada (United States)